Alien is a 1979 science fiction horror film directed by Ridley Scott and written by Dan O'Bannon. Based on a story by O'Bannon and Ronald Shusett, it follows the crew of the commercial space tug Nostromo, who, after coming across a mysterious derelict spaceship on an uncharted planetoid, find themselves up against an aggressive and deadly extraterrestrial set loose on the Nostromo. The film stars Tom Skerritt, Sigourney Weaver, Veronica Cartwright, Harry Dean Stanton, John Hurt, Ian Holm, and Yaphet Kotto. It was produced by Gordon Carroll, David Giler, and Walter Hill through their company Brandywine Productions and was distributed by 20th Century Fox. Giler and Hill revised and made additions to the script; Shusett was the executive producer. The Alien and its accompanying artifacts were designed by the Swiss artist H. R. Giger, while concept artists Ron Cobb and Chris Foss designed the more human settings.

Alien premiered on May 25, 1979, as the opening night of the fourth Seattle International Film Festival, presented in 70 mm at midnight. It received a wide release on June 22 and was released on September 6 in the United Kingdom. It was met with mixed reviews on release but was a box-office success, winning the Academy Award for Best Visual Effects, three Saturn Awards (Best Science Fiction Film, Best Direction for Scott, and Best Supporting Actress for Cartwright), and a Hugo Award for Best Dramatic Presentation. Critical reassessment since then has resulted in Alien being widely considered to be one of the greatest science fiction and horror films of all time. In 2002, Alien was deemed "culturally, historically, or aesthetically significant" by the Library of Congress and was selected for preservation in the United States National Film Registry. In 2008, it was ranked by the American Film Institute as the seventh-best film in the science fiction genre, and as the 33rd-greatest film of all time by Empire.

The success of Alien spawned a media franchise of films, novels, comic books, video games, and toys. It also launched Weaver's acting career, providing her with her first lead role. The story of her character's encounters with the alien creatures became the thematic and narrative core of the sequels Aliens (1986), Alien 3 (1992), and Alien Resurrection (1997). A crossover with the Predator franchise produced the Alien vs. Predator films: Alien vs. Predator (2004) and Aliens vs. Predator: Requiem (2007). A prequel series includes Prometheus (2012) and Alien: Covenant (2017), both directed by Scott.

Plot 

The commercial space tug Nostromo is returning to Earth with a seven-member crew in stasis: Captain Dallas, Executive Officer Kane, Warrant Officer Ripley, Navigator Lambert, Science Officer Ash, and engineers Parker and Brett. Detecting a transmission from a nearby moon, the ship's computer, Mother, awakens the crew. Per company policy requiring any potential distress signal be investigated, they land on the moon despite Parker's protests, sustaining damage from its atmosphere and rocky landscape. The engineers stay on board for repairs while Dallas, Kane, and Lambert investigate the terrain. They discover the signal originates from a derelict alien ship and enter it, losing contact with the Nostromo. Ripley deciphers part of the transmission, determining it as a warning, but cannot relay the information to those on the derelict ship.

Meanwhile, Kane discovers a chamber containing hundreds of large, egg-like objects. When he touches one, a creature springs out, penetrates his helmet, and attaches itself to his face. Dallas and Lambert carry the unconscious Kane back to the Nostromo. As the acting senior officer, Ripley refuses to let them aboard, citing quarantine regulations, but Ash overrides her decision and lets them inside. Ash attempts to remove the creature from Kane's face but stops when he discovers that its extremely corrosive acidic blood could hurt Kane and potentially damage the hull. It later freely detaches and is found dead. The ship is partially repaired, and the crew continues their journey back to Earth. Kane awakens with some memory loss but seems to be otherwise unharmed. During a final crew meal before returning to stasis, he suddenly chokes and convulses. A small alien creature bursts from Kane's chest, killing him, and escapes into the ship, with Ash dissuading the rest from killing it.

After ejecting Kane's body out of an airlock, the crew attempts to locate the creature with tracking devices and capture it with nets, electric prods, and flamethrowers. Brett follows the crew's cat, Jones, into a landing leg compartment, where the now-fully-grown alien attacks Brett and disappears with his body. After a heated discussion, the crew decides the creature must be in the air ducts. Dallas enters the ducts, intending to force the monster into an airlock, but it ambushes and seemingly kills him. Lambert, realizing that the alien intends to kill the crew one by one, implores the others to abandon ship and escape in its small shuttle, but Ripley, now in command, explains it will not support four people and insists on continuing Dallas' plan of flushing out the alien.

Accessing Mother, Ripley discovers the company has secretly ordered Ash to return the alien, with the crew considered expendable. She confronts Ash, who tries to choke her to death. Parker intervenes and clubs Ash, knocking his head loose and revealing him as an android. He, Ripley, and Lambert reactivate Ash's head, and they learn that he was assigned to ensure the creature's survival. He expresses admiration for the creature's psychology, unhindered by conscience or morality, and taunts them about their chances of survival. Ripley cuts off his power and Parker incinerates him.

The remaining crew decides to self-destruct the Nostromo and escape in the shuttle. However, Parker and Lambert are ambushed and killed by the creature while gathering life-support supplies. Ripley initiates the self-destruct sequence but finds the alien blocking her path to the shuttle. She retreats and attempts unsuccessfully to abort the self-destruct. With no further options, she flees to the shuttle, carrying Jones, and narrowly escapes as the Nostromo explodes.

As Ripley prepares for stasis, she discovers that the alien is aboard, having wedged itself into a narrow space. She dons a spacesuit and uses gas to flush the creature out. It approaches Ripley, but before it can attack, she opens an airlock door, almost blasting it into space. However, it hangs on by gripping the frame. Ripley shoots it with a grappling hook, but the gun catches as the airlock door closes, tethering the alien to the shuttle. It pulls itself into an engine exhaust, but Ripley fires the engines, blasting it away into deep space. After recording the final log entry, she places Jones and herself into stasis for the trip back to Earth.

Cast

 
 Tom Skerritt as Dallas, captain of the Nostromo. Skerritt had been approached early in the film's development, but declined as it did not yet have a director and had a very low budget. Later, when Scott was attached as director and the budget had been doubled, Skerritt accepted the role.
 Sigourney Weaver as Ripley, the warrant officer aboard the Nostromo. Weaver, who had Broadway experience but was relatively unknown in film, impressed Scott, Giler, and Hill with her audition. She was the last actor to be cast for the film and performed most of her screen tests in-studio as the sets were being built. The role of Ripley was Weaver's first leading role in a motion picture and earned her nominations for a Saturn Award for Best Actress and a BAFTA award for Most Promising Newcomer to Leading Film Role.
 Veronica Cartwright as Lambert, the Nostromos navigator. Cartwright had experience in horror and science-fiction films, having acted as a child in The Birds (1963) and Invasion of the Body Snatchers (1978). She originally read for the role of Ripley and was not informed that she had instead been cast as Lambert until she arrived in London for wardrobe. She disliked the character's emotional weakness, but nevertheless accepted the role: "They convinced me that I was the audience's fears; I was a reflection of what the audience is feeling." Cartwright won a Saturn Award for Best Supporting Actress for her performance.
 Harry Dean Stanton as Brett, the engineering technician. Stanton's first words to Scott during his audition were, "I don't like sci fi or monster movies". Scott was amused and convinced Stanton to take the role after reassuring him that Alien would actually be a thriller more akin to Ten Little Indians.
 John Hurt as Kane, the executive officer who becomes the host for the alien. Hurt was Scott's first choice for the role, but he was contracted on a film in South Africa during Aliens filming dates, so Jon Finch was cast as Kane, instead. However, Finch became ill during the first day of shooting and was diagnosed with type 1 diabetes, which had also exacerbated a case of bronchitis. Hurt was in London by this time, his South African project having fallen through, and he quickly replaced Finch. His performance earned him a nomination for a BAFTA Award for Best Actor in a Supporting Role.
 Ian Holm as Ash, the ship's science officer who is revealed to be an android. Holm was a character actor, who, by 1979, had already been in 20 films.
 Yaphet Kotto as Parker, the chief engineer. Kotto, an African American, was chosen partly to add diversity to the cast and give the Nostromo crew an international flavor. Kotto was sent a script off the back of his recent success as villain Dr. Kananga in the James Bond film, Live and Let Die (1973), and said he rejected a lucrative film offer in the hope of being cast in Alien.
 Bolaji Badejo as the alien. Nigerian Badejo, while a 26-year-old design student, was discovered in a bar by a member of the casting team, who put him in touch with Scott. Stuntmen Eddie Powell and Roy Scammell also portrayed the alien in some scenes.
 Helen Horton as the voice of Mother, the Nostromo computer.

Production

Writing

While studying cinema at the University of Southern California, Dan O'Bannon had made a science-fiction comedy film, Dark Star, with director John Carpenter and concept artist Ron Cobb. The film featured an alien (created by spray-painting a beach ball and adding rubber "claws"); the experience left O'Bannon "really wanting to do an alien that looked real." A "couple of years" later he began work on a similar story that would focus more on horror. "I knew I wanted to do a scary movie on a spaceship with a small number of astronauts", he later recalled, "Dark Star as a horror movie instead of a comedy." Ronald Shusett, meanwhile, was working on an early version of what would eventually become Total Recall. Impressed by Dark Star, he contacted O'Bannon and the two agreed to collaborate on their projects, choosing to work on O'Bannon's film first, as they believed it would be less costly to produce.

O'Bannon had written 29 pages of a script titled Memory, containing what would become the opening scenes of Alien: a crew of astronauts awakens to find that their voyage has been interrupted because they are receiving a signal from a mysterious planetoid. They investigate and their ship breaks down on the surface. He did not yet have a clear idea as to what the alien antagonist of the story would be.

O'Bannon soon accepted an offer to work on Alejandro Jodorowsky's adaptation of Dune, a project that took him to Paris for six months. Though the project ultimately fell through, it introduced him to several artists whose work gave him ideas for his science-fiction story including Chris Foss, H. R. Giger, and Jean "Moebius" Giraud. O'Bannon was impressed by Foss's covers for science-fiction books, while he found Giger's work "disturbing": "His paintings had a profound effect on me. I had never seen anything that was quite as horrible and at the same time as beautiful as his work. And so I ended up writing a script about a Giger monster." After the Dune project collapsed, O'Bannon returned to Los Angeles to live with Shusett and the two revived his Memory script. Shusett suggested that O'Bannon use one of his other film ideas, about gremlins infiltrating a B-17 bomber during World War II, and set it on the spaceship as the second half of the story. The working title of the project was now Star Beast, but O'Bannon disliked this and changed it to Alien after noting the number of times that the word appeared in the script.  Shusett and he liked the new title's simplicity and its double meaning as both a noun and an adjective. Shusett came up with the idea that one of the crew members could be implanted with an alien embryo that would burst out of him; he thought this would be an interesting plot device by which the alien could get aboard the ship.

In writing the script, O'Bannon drew inspiration from many previous works of science fiction and horror. He later stated,"I didn't steal Alien from anybody. I stole it from everybody!" The Thing from Another World (1951) inspired the idea of professional men being pursued by a deadly alien creature through a claustrophobic environment. Forbidden Planet (1956) gave O'Bannon the idea of a ship being warned not to land, and then the crew being killed one by one by a mysterious creature when they defy the warning. Planet of the Vampires (1965) contains a scene in which the heroes discover a giant alien skeleton; this influenced the Nostromo crew's discovery of the alien creature in the derelict spacecraft. O'Bannon has also noted the influence of "Junkyard" (1953), a short story by Clifford D. Simak in which a crew lands on an asteroid and discovers a chamber full of eggs. He has also cited as influences Strange Relations by Philip José Farmer (1960), which covers alien reproduction, and various EC Comics horror titles carrying stories in which monsters eat their way out of people.

With most of the plot in place, Shusett and O'Bannon presented their script to several studios, pitching it as "Jaws in space." They were on the verge of signing a deal with Roger Corman's studio when a friend offered to find them a better deal and passed the script on to Gordon Carroll, David Giler, and Walter Hill, who had formed a production company called Brandywine with ties to 20th Century Fox. O'Bannon and Shusett signed a deal with Brandywine, but Hill and Giler were not satisfied with the script and made numerous rewrites and revisions. This caused tension with O'Bannon and Shusett, since Hill and Giler had very little experience with science fiction; according to Shusett, "They weren't good at making it better, or, in fact, at not making it even worse." O'Bannon believed that Hill and Giler were attempting to justify taking his name off the script and claiming  Shusett's and his work as their own. Hill and Giler did add some substantial elements to the story, including the android character Ash, which O'Bannon felt was an unnecessary subplot but which Shusett later described as "one of the best things in the movie...That whole idea and scenario was theirs." Hill and Giler went through eight drafts of the script in total, concentrating largely on the Ash subplot, but also making the dialogue more natural and trimming some sequences set on the alien planetoid. Despite the fact that the final shooting script was written by Hill and Giler, the Writers Guild of America awarded O'Bannon sole credit for the screenplay.

Development

Despite these rewrites, 20th Century Fox did not express confidence in financing a science-fiction film. However, after the success of Star Wars in 1977, the studio's interest in the genre rose substantially. According to Carroll: "When Star Wars came out and was the extraordinary hit that it was, suddenly science fiction became the hot genre." O'Bannon recalled that "They wanted to follow through on Star Wars, and they wanted to follow through fast, and the only spaceship script they had sitting on their desk was Alien". Alien was greenlit by 20th Century Fox, with an initial budget of $4.2 million. Alien was funded by North Americans, but made by 20th Century-Fox's British production subsidiary.

O'Bannon had originally assumed that he would direct Alien, but 20th Century Fox instead asked Hill to direct. Hill declined due to other film commitments, as well as not being comfortable with the level of visual effects that would be required. Peter Yates, Jack Clayton, and Robert Aldrich were considered for the task, but O'Bannon, Shusett, and the Brandywine team felt that these directors would not take the film seriously and would instead treat it as a B monster movie. Giler, Hill, and Carroll had been impressed by Scott's debut feature film The Duellists (1977) and made an offer to him to direct Alien, which Scott quickly accepted. Scott created detailed storyboards for the film in London, which impressed Fox enough to double the film's budget. His storyboards included designs for the spaceship and space suits, drawing on such films as 2001: A Space Odyssey and Star Wars. However, he was keen on emphasizing horror in Alien rather than fantasy, describing the film as "The Texas Chain Saw Massacre of science fiction".

Casting

Casting calls and auditions for Alien were held in both New York City and London. With only seven human characters in the story, Scott sought to hire strong actors so he could focus most of his energy on the film's visual style. He employed casting director Mary Selway, who had worked with him on The Duellists, to head the casting in the United Kingdom, while Mary Goldberg handled casting in the United States. In developing the story, O'Bannon had focused on writing the alien first, putting off developing the other characters.  Shusett and he had intentionally written all the roles generically; they made a note in the script that explicitly states, "The crew is unisex and all parts are interchangeable for men or women." This freed Scott, Selway, and Goldberg to interpret the characters as they pleased, and to cast accordingly. They wanted the Nostromos crew to resemble working astronauts in a realistic environment, a concept summarized as "truckers in space". According to Scott, this concept was inspired partly by Star Wars, which deviated from the pristine future often depicted in science-fiction films of the time.

To assist the actors in preparing for their roles, Scott wrote several pages of backstory for each character explaining their histories. He filmed many of their rehearsals to capture spontaneity and improvisation, and tensions between some of the cast members, particularly towards the less-experienced Weaver; this translated convincingly to film as tension between the characters.

Roger Ebert notes that the actors in Alien were older than was typical in thriller films at the time, which helped make the characters more convincing:

David McIntee, author of Beautiful Monsters: The Unofficial and Unauthorised Guide to the Alien and Predator Films, asserts that part of the film's effectiveness in frightening viewers "comes from the fact that the audience can all identify with the characters...Everyone aboard the Nostromo is a normal, everyday, working Joe just like the rest of us. They just happen to live and work in the future."

Filming

Alien was filmed over 14 weeks from July 5 to October 21, 1978. Principal photography took place at Shepperton Studios near London, while model and miniature filming was done at Bray Studios in Water Oakley, Berkshire. The production schedule was short due to the film's low budget and pressure from 20th Century Fox to finish on time.

A crew of over 200 craftspeople and technicians constructed the three principal sets: the surface of the alien planetoid, and the interiors of the Nostromo and the derelict spacecraft. Art director Les Dilley created -scale miniatures of the planetoid's surface and derelict spacecraft based on Giger's designs, then made moulds and casts and scaled them up as diagrams for the wood and fiberglass forms of the sets. Tons of sand, plaster, fiberglass, rock, and gravel were shipped into the studio to sculpt a desert landscape for the planetoid's surface, which the actors would walk across wearing space-suit costumes. The suits were thick, bulky, and lined with nylon, had no cooling systems, and initially, no venting for their exhaled carbon dioxide to escape. Combined with a heat wave, these conditions nearly caused the actors to pass out; nurses had to be kept on-hand with oxygen tanks.

For scenes showing the exterior of the Nostromo, a  landing leg was constructed to give a sense of the ship's size. Scott was not convinced that it looked large enough, so he had his two young sons and the son of Derek Vanlint (the film's cinematographer) stand in for the regular actors, wearing smaller space suits to make the set pieces seem larger. The same technique was used for the scene in which the crew members encounter the dead alien creature in the derelict spacecraft. The children nearly collapsed due to the heat of the suits; oxygen systems were eventually added to help the actors breathe. Four identical cats were used to portray Jones, the crew's pet. During filming, Sigourney Weaver discovered that she was allergic to the combination of cat hair and the glycerin placed on the actors' skin to make them appear sweaty. By removing the glycerin she was able to continue working with the cats.

Alien originally was to conclude with the destruction of the Nostromo while Ripley escapes in the shuttle Narcissus. However, Scott conceived of a "fourth act" to the film in which the alien appears on the shuttle and Ripley is forced to confront it. He pitched the idea to 20th Century Fox and negotiated an increase in the budget to film the scene over several extra days. Scott had wanted the alien to bite off Ripley's head and then make the final log entry in her voice, but the producers vetoed this idea, because they believed the alien should die at the end of the film.

Post-production
Editing and post-production work on Alien took roughly 20 weeks to complete, concluding in late-January 1979. Terry Rawlings served as editor, having previously worked with Scott on editing sound for The Duellists. Scott and Rawlings edited much of the film to have a slow pace to build suspense for the more tense and frightening moments. According to Rawlings: "I think the way we did get it right was by keeping it slow, funny enough, which is completely different from what they do today. And I think the slowness of it made the moments that you wanted people to be sort of scared...then we could go as fast as we liked because you've sucked people into a corner and then attacked them, so to speak. And I think that's how it worked." The first cut of the film was over three hours long; further editing trimmed the final version to just under two hours.

One scene that was cut from the film occurred during Ripley's final escape from the Nostromo; she encounters Dallas and Brett, who have been partially cocooned by the alien. O'Bannon had intended the scene to indicate that Brett was becoming an alien egg, while Dallas was held nearby to be implanted by the resulting facehugger. Production designer Michael Seymour later suggested that Dallas had "become sort of food for the alien creature", while Ivor Powell suggested that "Dallas is found in the ship as an egg, still alive." Scott remarked, "they're morphing, metamorphosing, they are changing into...being consumed, I guess, by whatever the alien's organism is...into an egg." The scene was cut partly because it did not look realistic enough, but also because it slowed the pace of the escape sequence. Tom Skerritt remarked that "The picture had to have that pace. Her trying to get the hell out of there, we're all rooting for her to get out of there, and for her to slow up and have a conversation with Dallas was not appropriate." The footage was included with other deleted scenes as a special feature on the Laserdisc release of Alien, and a shortened version of it was reinserted into the 2003 Director's Cut, which was re-released in theaters and on DVD.

Music

The musical score for Alien was composed by Jerry Goldsmith, conducted by Lionel Newman, and performed by the National Philharmonic Orchestra. Scott had originally wanted the film to be scored by Isao Tomita, but Fox wanted a more familiar composer and Goldsmith was recommended by then-president of Fox Alan Ladd Jr. Goldsmith wanted to create a sense of romanticism and lyrical mystery in the film's opening scenes, which would build throughout the film to suspense and fear. Scott did not like Goldsmith's original main title piece, however, so Goldsmith rewrote it as "the obvious thing: weird and strange, and which everybody loved." Another source of tension was editor Terry Rawlings' choice to use pieces of Goldsmith's music from previous films, including a piece from Freud: The Secret Passion, and to use an excerpt from Howard Hanson's Symphony No. 2 ("Romantic") for the end credits.

Scott and Rawlings had also become attached to several of the musical cues they had used for the temporary score while editing the film, and re-edited some of Goldsmith's cues and rescored several sequences to match these cues and even left the temporary score in place in some parts of the finished film. Goldsmith later remarked, "you can see that I was sort of like going at opposite ends of the pole with the filmmakers." Nevertheless, Scott praised Goldsmith's score as "full of dark beauty" and "seriously threatening, but beautiful." It was nominated for a Golden Globe Award for Best Original Score, a Grammy Award for Best Soundtrack Album, and it won a BAFTA Award for Best Film Music. The score has been released as a soundtrack album in several versions with different tracks and sequences.

Design

Creature effects

O'Bannon introduced Scott to the artwork of H. R. Giger; both of them felt that his painting Necronom IV was the type of representation they wanted for the film's antagonist and began asking the studio to hire him as a designer. 20th Century Fox initially believed Giger's work was too ghastly for audiences, but the Brandywine team were persistent and eventually won out. According to Gordon Carroll: "The first second that Ridley saw Giger's work, he knew that the biggest single design problem, maybe the biggest problem in the film, had been solved." Scott flew to Zürich to meet Giger and recruited him to work on all aspects of the alien and its environment including the surface of the planetoid, the derelict spacecraft, and all four forms of the alien from the egg to the adult.

The scene of Kane inspecting the egg was shot in postproduction. A fiberglass egg was used so that actor John Hurt could shine his light on it and see movement inside, which was provided by Scott fluttering his hands inside the egg while wearing rubber gloves. The top of the egg was hydraulic, and the innards were a cow's stomach and tripe. Test shots of the eggs were filmed using hen's eggs, and this footage was used in early teaser trailers. For this reason, the image of a hen's egg was used on the poster and has become emblematic of the franchise as a whole—as opposed to the alien egg that appears in the finished film.

The "facehugger" and its proboscis, which was made of a sheep's intestine, were shot out of the egg using high-pressure air hoses. The shot was reversed and slowed down in editing to prolong the effect and reveal more detail. The facehugger itself was the first creature that H.R. Giger designed for the film, going through several versions in different sizes before deciding on a small creature with human-like fingers and a long tail. Dan O'Bannon, with help from Ron Cobb, drew his own version based on Giger's design, which became the final version. Cobb came up with the idea that the creature could have a powerful acid for blood, a characteristic that would carry over to the adult Alien and would make it impossible for the crew to kill it by conventional means, such as guns or explosives, since the acid would burn through the ship's hull. For the scene in which the dead facehugger is examined, Scott used pieces of fish and shellfish to create its viscera.

The design of the "chestburster" was inspired by Francis Bacon's 1944 painting Three Studies for Figures at the Base of a Crucifixion. Giger's original design, which was refined, resembled a plucked chicken. Screenwriter Dan O'Bannon credits his experiences with Crohn's disease for inspiring the chest-bursting scene.

For the filming of the chestburster scene, the cast members knew that the creature would be bursting out of Hurt, and had seen the chestburster puppet, but they had not been told that fake blood would also be bursting out in every direction from high-pressure pumps and squibs. The scene was shot in one take using an artificial torso filled with blood and viscera, with Hurt's head and arms coming up from underneath the table. The chestburster was shoved up through the torso by a puppeteer who held it on a stick. When the creature burst through the chest, a stream of blood shot directly at Cartwright, shocking her enough that she fell over and went into hysterics. According to Tom Skerritt, "What you saw on camera was the real response. She had no idea what the hell happened. All of a sudden this thing just came up." The creature then runs off-camera, an effect accomplished by cutting a slit in the table for the puppeteer's stick to go through and passing an air hose through the puppet's tail to make it whip about.

The real-life surprise of the actors gave the scene an intense sense of realism and made it one of the film's most memorable moments. During preview screenings, the crew noticed that some viewers would move towards the back of the theater so as not to be too close to the screen during the sequence. The scene has frequently been called one of the most memorable moments in cinema history. In 2007, Empire named it as the greatest 18-rated moment in film, ranking it above the decapitation scene in The Omen (1976) and the transformation sequence in An American Werewolf in London (1981). IGN ranked the scene 10th out of the 100 best movie moments of all time.

For the scene in which Ash is revealed to be an android, a puppet was created of the character's torso and upper body, which was operated from underneath. During a preview screening of the film, this scene caused an usher to faint. In the following scene, Ash's head is placed on a table and reactivated; for portions of this scene, an animatronic head was made using a face cast of the actor, Ian Holm. However, the latex of the head shrank while curing and the result was not entirely convincing. For the bulk of the scene, Holm knelt under the table with his head coming up through a hole. Milk, caviar, pasta, fiber optics, and Foley urinary catheters were combined to form the android's innards.

The alien

Giger made several conceptual paintings of the adult alien before settling on the final version. He sculpted the creature's body using plasticine, incorporating pieces such as vertebrae from snakes and cooling tubes from a Rolls-Royce. The creature's head was manufactured separately by Carlo Rambaldi, who had worked on the aliens in Close Encounters of the Third Kind. Rambaldi followed Giger's designs closely, making some modifications to incorporate the moving parts that would animate the jaw and inner mouth. A system of hinges and cables was used to operate the creature's rigid tongue, which protruded from its mouth and featured a second mouth at its tip with its own set of movable teeth. The final head had about 900 moving parts and points of articulation. Part of a human skull was used as the "face", and was hidden under the smooth, translucent cover of the head. Rambaldi's original alien jaw is now on display in the Smithsonian Institution, while in April 2007, the original alien suit was sold at auction. Copious amounts of K-Y Jelly were used to simulate saliva and to give the alien an overall slimy appearance. The creature's vocalizations were provided by Percy Edwards, a voice artist famous for providing bird sounds for British television throughout the 1960s and 1970s, as well as the whale sounds for Orca: Killer Whale (1977).

For most of the film's scenes, the alien was portrayed by Bolaji Badejo. A latex costume was made to fit Badejo's slender  frame by taking a full-body plaster cast. Scott later commented that the alien "takes on elements of the host – in this case, a man." Badejo attended t'ai chi and mime classes  to create convincing movements for the alien. For some scenes, such as when the alien lowers itself from the ceiling to kill Brett, the creature was portrayed by stuntmen Eddie Powell and Roy Scammell. Powell, in costume, was suspended on wires and then lowered in an unfurling motion.

Scott chose not to show the full Alien for most of the film, keeping most of its body in shadow to create a sense of terror and heighten suspense. The audience could thus project their own fears into imagining what the rest of the creature might look like: "Every movement is going to be very slow, very graceful, and the alien will alter shape so you never really know exactly what he looks like." Scott said:

The Alien has been referred to as "one of the most iconic movie monsters in film history", and its biomechanical appearance and sexual overtones have been frequently noted. Roger Ebert remarked that "Alien uses a tricky device to keep the alien fresh throughout the movie: It evolves the nature and appearance of the creature, so we never know quite what it looks like or what it can do... The first time we get a good look at the alien, as it bursts from the chest of poor Kane (John Hurt). It is unmistakably phallic in shape, and the critic Tim Dirks mentions its 'open, dripping vaginal mouth.

Sets
The sets of the Nostromos three decks were each created almost entirely in one piece, with each deck occupying a separate stage. The actors had to navigate through the hallways that connected the stages, adding to the film's sense of claustrophobia and realism. The sets used large transistors and low-resolution computer screens to give the ship a "used", industrial look and make it appear as though it was constructed of "retrofitted old technology". Ron Cobb created industrial-style symbols and color-coded signs for various areas and aspects of the ship. The company that owns the Nostromo is not named in the film, and is referred to by the characters as "the company". However, the name and logo of the company appears on several set pieces and props such as computer monitors and beer cans as "Weylan-Yutani". Cobb created the name to imply a business alliance between Britain and Japan, deriving "Weylan" from the British Leyland Motor Corporation and "Yutani" from the name of his Japanese neighbor. The 1986 sequel, Aliens, named the company as "Weyland-Yutani", and it has remained a central aspect of the film franchise.

Art director Roger Christian used scrap metal and parts to create set pieces and props to save money, a technique he employed while working on Star Wars. For example, some of the Nostromo corridors were created from portions of scrapped bomber aircraft, and a mirror was used to create the illusion of longer corridors in the below-deck area. Special-effects supervisors Brian Johnson and Nick Allder made many of the set pieces and props function, including moving chairs, computer monitors, motion trackers, and flamethrowers.

H. R. Giger designed and worked on all of the alien aspects of the film, which he designed to appear organic and biomechanical in contrast to the industrial look of the Nostromo and its human elements. For the interior of the derelict spacecraft and egg chamber, he used dried bones  with plaster to sculpt much of the scenery and elements. Veronica Cartwright described Giger's sets as "so erotic...it's big vaginas and penises...the whole thing is like you're going inside of some sort of womb or whatever...it's sort of visceral". The set with the deceased alien creature, which the production team nicknamed the "space jockey", proved problematic, as 20th Century Fox did not want to spend the money for such an expensive set that would only be used for one scene. Scott described the set as the cockpit or driving deck of the mysterious ship, and the production team was able to convince the studio that the scene was important to impress the audience and make them aware that this was not a B movie. To save money, only one wall of the set was created, and the "space jockey" sat atop a disc that could be rotated to facilitate shots from different angles in relation to the actors. Giger airbrushed the entire set and the "space jockey" by hand.

The origin of the jockey creature was not explored in the film, but Scott later theorized that it might have been the ship's pilot, and that the ship might have been a weapons-carrier capable of dropping alien eggs onto a planet so that the aliens could use the local lifeforms as hosts. In early versions of the script, the eggs were to be located in a separate pyramid structure, which would be found later by the Nostromo crew and would contain statues and hieroglyphs depicting the alien reproductive cycle, contrasting the human, alien, and space-jockey cultures. Cobb, Foss, and Giger each created concept artwork for these sequences, but they were eventually discarded due to budgetary concerns and the need to shorten the film. Instead, the egg chamber was set inside the derelict ship and was filmed on the same set as the space-jockey scene; the entire disc piece supporting the jockey and its chair was removed and the set was redressed to create the egg chamber. Light effects in the egg chamber were created by lasers borrowed from English rock band The Who. The band was testing the lasers for use in their stage show on the sound stage next door.

Spaceships and planets

O'Bannon brought in artists Ron Cobb and Chris Foss, with whom he had worked on Dark Star and Dune, respectively, to work on designs for the human aspects of the film such as the spaceship and space suits. Cobb created hundreds of preliminary sketches of the interiors and exteriors of the ship, which went through many design concepts and possible names such as Leviathan and Snark as the script was developed. The final name of the ship was derived from the title of Joseph Conrad's 1904 novel Nostromo, while the escape shuttle, called Narcissus in the script, was named after Conrad's 1897 novella The Nigger of the 'Narcissus'. The production team particularly praised Cobb's ability to depict the interior settings of the ship in a realistic and believable manner. Cobb also created some conceptual drawings of the alien, but these were not used. Moebius was attached to the project for a few days, as well, and his costume renderings served as the basis for the final space suits created by costume designer John Mollo.

The spaceships and planets for the film were shot using models and miniatures. These included models of the Nostromo, its attached mineral refinery, the escape shuttle Narcissus, the alien planetoid, and the exterior and interior of the derelict spacecraft. The designs of the Nostromo and its attachments were based on combinations of Scott's storyboards and Ron Cobb's conceptual drawings. The basic outlines of the models were made of wood and plastic, and most of the fine details were added from model kits of warships, tanks, and World War II bombers.

Scott insisted on numerous changes to the models even as filming was taking place, leading to conflicts with the modeling and filming teams. The Nostromo was originally yellow, and the team filmed shots of the models for six weeks before Johnson left to work on The Empire Strikes Back. Scott then ordered it changed to gray, and the team had to begin shooting again from scratch. He asked that more and more pieces be added to the model such that the final version (with the refinery) required a metal framework so that it could be hoisted by a forklift. He also took a hammer and chisel to sections of the refinery, knocking off many of the spires that Bower had spent weeks creating. Scott also had disagreements with miniature-effects cinematographer Dennis Ayling over how to light the models.

Bower carved Kane's burial shroud out of wood; it was launched through the hatch using a small catapult and filmed at high speed. The footage was slowed down in editing. Only one shot was filmed using blue-screen compositing - that of the shuttle racing past the Nostromo. The other shots were simply filmed against black backdrops, with stars added by double exposure. Though motion control photography technology was available at the time, the film's budget would not allow for it. The team, therefore, used a camera with wide-angle lenses mounted on a drive mechanism to make slow passes over and around the models filming at  frames per second, giving them the appearance of motion. Scott added smoke and wind effects to enhance the illusion. For the scene in which the Nostromo detaches from the refinery, a  docking arm was created using pieces from model railway kits. The Nostromo was pushed away from the refinery by a forklift covered in black velvet, causing the arm to extend out from the refinery. This created the illusion that the arm was pushing the ship forward. Shots of the ship's exterior in which characters are seen moving around inside were filmed using larger models which contained projection screens displaying pre-recorded footage.

A separate model was created for the exterior of the derelict alien spacecraft. Matte paintings were used to fill in areas of the ship's interior, as well as exterior shots of the planetoid's surface. The surface as seen from space during the landing sequence was created by painting a globe white, then mixing chemicals and dyes onto transparencies and projecting them onto it. The planetoid was not named in the film, but some drafts of the script gave it the name Acheron after the river which in Greek mythology is described as the "stream of woe"; it is a branch of the river Styx, and forms the border of Hell in Dante's Inferno. The 1986 sequel Aliens named the planetoid as "LV-426", and both names have been used for it in subsequent expanded-universe media such as comic books and video games.

Title sequence
The title sequence was developed by R/Greenberg Associates "to instill a sense of foreboding, the letters broken into pieces, the space between them unsettling." It is referenced as one of the most iconic opening sequences of all time.

Release

An initial screening of Alien for 20th Century Fox representatives in St. Louis was marred by poor sound. A subsequent screening in a newer theater in Dallas went significantly better, eliciting genuine fright from the audience. Two theatrical trailers were shown to the public. The first consisted of rapidly changing still images set to some of Jerry Goldsmith's electronic music from Logan's Run, with the tagline in both the trailer and on the teaser poster "A word of warning...". The second used test footage of a hen's egg set to part of Goldsmith's Alien score. The film was previewed in various American cities in the spring of 1979 and was promoted with the tagline "In space, no one can hear you scream."

Alien was rated "R" in the United States, "X" in the United Kingdom, and "M" in Australia. In the UK, the British Board of Film Censors almost passed the film as an "AA" (for ages 14 and over), although concerns existed over the prevalent sexual imagery. 20th Century Fox eventually relented in pushing for an AA certificate after deciding that an X rating would make it easier to sell as a horror film.

Alien opened in a limited release in American theaters on May 25, 1979. The film had no formal premiere, yet moviegoers lined up for blocks to see it at Grauman's Egyptian Theatre in Hollywood, where a number of models, sets, and props were displayed outside to promote it during its first run. It received a wide release in the United States on June 22. Vandals set fire to the model of the space jockey, believing it to be the work of the devil. The film started its international release in Japan on July 20 and then Brazil on August 20. In the United Kingdom, Alien premiered at a gala performance at the Edinburgh Film Festival on September 1, 1979, before starting an exclusive run at the Odeon Leicester Square in London on Thursday, September 6, 1979, for one week before expanding slowly until opening wide in Britain in 180 theaters on October 1, 1979. The film opened in France and Spain in September before expanding to other markets in October 1979.

Box office
The film was a commercial success, opening in 90 theatres across the United States (plus 1 in Canada), setting 51 house records and grossing $3,527,881 over the 4-day Memorial Day weekend with a per-screen average of $38,767, which Daily Variety suggested may have been the biggest per-screen opening in history. In its first 4 weeks it grossed $16.5 million from only 148 prints before expanding to 635 screens. In the UK, the film grossed $126,150 in its first 4 days at the Odeon Leicester Square, setting a house record. By the beginning of October 1979, the film had grossed $27 million internationally including $16.9 million in Japan, $4.8 million in France and $3.7 million in the UK. It went on to gross $78.9 million in the United States and £7,886,000 in the United Kingdom during its first run. Including reissues, it has grossed $81.8 million in the United States and Canada, while international box-office figures have varied from $24 million to $122.7 million. Its total worldwide gross has been listed within the range of $104.9 million to $203.6 million. In 1992, Fox noted the worldwide gross was $143 million.

Despite this apparent box-office success, 20th Century Fox claimed that in the 11 months since its release, Alien had lost the studio $2 million. Seen as an example of Hollywood creative accounting used by Fox to disguise the film revenue and limit any payments to Brandywine, the claim was decried by industry accountants, and by August 1980, Fox readjusted the figure to $4 million profit, although this was similarly refuted. Eager to begin work on a sequel, Brandywine sued Fox over their profit distribution tactics, but Fox claimed that Alien was not a financial success and did not warrant a sequel. The lawsuit was settled in 1983 when Fox agreed to fund an Alien II.

Critical reception
Critical reaction to the film was initially mixed. Some critics who were not usually favorable towards science fiction, such as Barry Norman of the BBC's Film series, were positive about the film's merits. Others, however, were not; reviews by Variety, Sight and Sound, Vincent Canby, and Leonard Maltin were mixed or negative. (Maltin reassessed the film upon the release of the Director's Cut and gave Alien a positive review.) A review by Time Out said the film was an "empty bag of tricks whose production values and expensive trickery cannot disguise imaginative poverty". In their original review on Sneak Previews, critics Gene Siskel and Roger Ebert gave the film "two 'yes' votes." Ebert called it "one of the scariest old-fashioned space operas I can remember." Siskel agreed that it was scary but said it was basically a "haunted house film" set "in a spaceship" and was "not the greatest science fiction film ever made." Siskel gave the film three stars out of four in his original print review, calling it "an accomplished piece of scary entertainment" and praising Sigourney Weaver as "an actress who should become a major star," but listed among the film's disappointments that "[f]or me, the final shape of the alien was the least scary of its forms."

Accolades

Alien won the 1980 Academy Award for Best Visual Effects and was also nominated for Best Art Direction (for Michael Seymour, Leslie Dilley, Roger Christian, and Ian Whittaker). It won Saturn Awards for Best Science Fiction Film, Best Direction for Ridley Scott, and Best Supporting Actress for Veronica Cartwright, and was also nominated in the categories of Best Actress for Sigourney Weaver, Best Make-up for Pat Hay, Best Special Effects for Brian Johnson and Nick Allder, and Best Writing for Dan O'Bannon. It was also nominated for British Academy of Film and Television Arts (BAFTA) awards for Best Costume Design for John Mollo, Best Editing for Terry Rawlings, Best Supporting Actor for John Hurt, and Most Promising Newcomer to Leading Film Role for Sigourney Weaver. It also won a Hugo Award for Best Dramatic Presentation and was nominated for a British Society of Cinematographers award for Best Cinematography for Derek Vanlint, as well as a Silver Seashell award for Best Cinematography and Special Effects at the San Sebastián International Film Festival. Jerry Goldsmith's score received nominations for the Golden Globe Award for Best Original Score, the Grammy Award for Best Soundtrack Album, and won a BAFTA Award for Best Film Music.

Post-release

Home video
Alien has been released in many home video formats and packages over the years. The first of these was a 17-minute Super-8 version for home projectionists. It was also released on both VHS and Betamax for rental, which grossed it an additional $40,300,000 in the United States alone. Several VHS releases were subsequently issued both separately and as boxed sets. LaserDisc and Videodisc versions followed, including deleted scenes and director commentary as bonus features. A VHS box set containing Alien and its sequels Aliens and Alien 3 was released in facehugger-shaped boxes, and included some of the deleted scenes from the Laserdisc editions. When Alien Resurrection premiered in theaters, another set of the first three films was released including a Making of Alien Resurrection tape. A few months later, the set was re-released with the full version of Alien Resurrection taking the place of the making-of video. Alien was released on DVD in 1999, both separately and, as The Alien Legacy, packaged with Aliens, Alien 3 and Alien Resurrection. This set, which was also released in a VHS version, included a commentary track by Ridley Scott. The first three films of the series have also been packaged as the Alien Triple Pack.

In 2003, 20th Century Fox was preparing the Alien Quadrilogy DVD box set, which would include Alien and its three sequels. In addition, the set would also include alternative versions of all four films in the form of "special editions" and "director's cuts". Fox approached Scott to digitally restore and remaster Alien, and to restore several scenes which had been cut during the editing process for inclusion in an expanded version of the film. Upon viewing the expanded version, Scott felt that it was too long and chose to recut it into a more streamlined alternative version:

The "Director's Cut" restored roughly four minutes of deleted footage, while cutting about five minutes of other material, leaving it about a minute shorter than the theatrical cut. Many of the changes were minor, such as altered sound effects, while the restored footage included the scene in which Ripley discovers the cocooned Dallas and Brett during her escape of the Nostromo. Fox released the Director's Cut in theaters on October 31, 2003. The Alien Quadrilogy boxed set was released December 2, 2003, with both versions of the film included along with a new commentary track featuring many of the film's actors, writers, and production staff, as well as other special features and a documentary entitled The Beast Within: The Making of Alien. Each film was also released separately as a DVD with both versions of the film included. Scott noted that he was very pleased with the original theatrical cut of Alien, saying that "For all intents and purposes, I felt that the original cut of Alien was perfect. I still feel that way", and that the original 1979 theatrical version "remains my version of choice". He has since stated that he considers both versions "director's cuts", as he feels that the 1979 version was the best he could possibly have made it at the time.

The Alien Quadrilogy set earned Alien a number of new awards and nominations. It won DVDX Exclusive Awards for Best Audio Commentary and Best Overall DVD, Classic Movie, and was also nominated for Best Behind-the-Scenes Program and Best Menu Design. It also won a Saturn Award for Best DVD, and was nominated for Best DVD Collection and Golden Satellite Awards for Best DVD Extras and Best Overall DVD. In 2010 both the theatrical version and Director's Cut of Alien were released on Blu-ray Disc, as a stand-alone release and as part of the Alien Anthology set.

In 2014, to mark the film's 35th anniversary, a special re-release boxed set named Alien: 35th Anniversary Edition, containing the film on Blu-ray, a digital copy, a reprint of Alien: The Illustrated Story, and a series of collectible art cards containing artwork by H.R. Giger related to the film, was released. A soundtrack album was released, featuring selections of Goldsmith's score. Additionally, a single of the Main Theme was released in 1980, and a disco single using audio excerpts from the film was released in 1979 on the UK label Bronze Records by a recording artist under the name Nostromo. Alien was re-released on Ultra HD Blu-ray and 4K digital download on April 23, 2019, in honor of the film's 40th anniversary. The 4k Blu-ray Disc presents the film in 2160p resolution with HDR10 High-dynamic-range video. Several previously released bonus features on the 4k Blu-ray include audio commentary from Director Ridley Scott, cast and crew, the final isolated theatrical score and composer's original isolated score by Jerry Goldsmith, and deleted and extended scenes.

Cinematic analysis
Critics have analyzed Alien sexual overtones. The film is often cited as a major work of abjection, as outlined by Julia Kristeva in her 1980 work Powers of Horror. According to Kristeva, the abject refers to that which signifies the breakdown of conventional borders and rules. It confronts the subject with the fallibility of the human body and societal norms, and thus exposes how the supposedly sacred distinctions between what is Self and what is Other are arbitrary. She suggests that this confrontation—often manifesting in excrement, bodily invasion and corpses—is an inherently traumatic interruption of subjectivity, and thus all evidence of abjection is hidden in conventional society. Much of Alien effectiveness as a work of horror has been attributed to its indulgence in abject themes and imagery and has thus functioned as a major framework for critics, such as Barbara Creed, in their analysis of the film. Following Creed's assertion that the alien creature is a representation of the "monstrous-feminine as archaic mother", Ximena Gallardo C. and C. Jason Smith compared the facehugger's attack on Kane to a male rape and the chestburster scene to a form of violent birth, noting that the alien's phallic head and method of killing the crew members add to the sexual imagery. Dan O'Bannon, who wrote the film's screenplay, has argued that the scene is a metaphor for the male fear of penetration, and that the "oral invasion" of Kane by the facehugger functions as "payback" for the many horror films in which sexually vulnerable women are attacked by male monsters. David McIntee claims that "Alien is a rape movie as much as Straw Dogs (1971) or I Spit on Your Grave (1978), or The Accused (1988). On one level, it's about an intriguing alien threat. On one level it's about parasitism and disease. And on the level that was most important to the writers and director, it's about sex, and reproduction by non-consensual means. And it's about this happening to a man." He notes how the film plays on men's fear and misunderstanding of pregnancy and childbirth, while also giving women a glimpse into these fears.

Film analyst Lina Badley has written that the alien's design, with strong Freudian sexual undertones, multiple phallic symbols, and overall feminine figure, provides an androgynous image conforming to archetypal mappings and imageries in horror films that often redraw gender lines. O'Bannon described the sexual imagery as overt and intentional: "I am going to put in every image I can think of to make the men in the audience cross their legs. Homosexual oral rape, birth. The thing lays its eggs down your throat, the whole number."

Alien roots in earlier works of fiction have been analyzed and acknowledged extensively by critics. The film has been said to have much in common with B movies such as The Thing from Another World (1951), Creature from the Black Lagoon (1954), It! The Terror from Beyond Space (1958), Night of the Blood Beast (1958), and Queen of Blood (1966),
as well as its fellow 1970s horror films Jaws (1975) and Halloween (1978). Literary connections have also been suggested: Philip French of the Guardian has perceived thematic parallels with Agatha Christie's And Then There Were None (1939). Many critics have also suggested that the film derives in part from A. E. van Vogt's The Voyage of the Space Beagle (1950), particularly its stories "The Black Destroyer", in which a cat-like alien infiltrates the ship and hunts the crew; and "Discord in Scarlet", in which an alien implants parasitic eggs inside crew members which then hatch and eat their way out. O'Bannon denies that this was a source of his inspiration for Alien story. Van Vogt in fact initiated a lawsuit against 20th Century Fox over the similarities, but Fox settled out of court.

Several critics have suggested that the film was inspired by Italian filmmaker Mario Bava's cult classic Planet of the Vampires (1965), in both narrative details and visual design. Rick Sanchez of IGN has noted the "striking resemblance" between the two movies, especially in a celebrated sequence in which the crew discovers a ruin containing the skeletal remains of long dead giant beings, and in the design and shots of the ship itself. Cinefantastique also noted the remarkable similarities between these scenes and other minor parallels. Robert Monell, on the DVD Maniacs website, observed that much of the conceptual design and some specific imagery in Alien "undoubtedly owes a great debt" to Bava's film. Despite these similarities, O'Bannon and Scott both claimed in a 1979 interview that they had not seen Planet of the Vampires.

Writer David McIntee, as well as reviewers for PopMatters and Den of Geek, have noted similarities to the Doctor Who serial The Ark in Space (1975), in which an insectoid queen alien lays larvae inside humans which later eat their way out, a life cycle inspired by that of the ichneumon wasp. McIntee also noted similarities between the first half of the film, particularly in early versions of the script, to H. P. Lovecraft's At the Mountains of Madness, "not in storyline, but in dread-building mystery", and calls the finished film "the best Lovecraftian movie ever made, without being a Lovecraft adaptation", due to its similarities in tone and atmosphere to Lovecraft's works. In 2009, O'Bannon said the film was "strongly influenced, tone-wise, by Lovecraft, and one of the things it proved is that you can't adapt Lovecraft effectively without an extremely strong visual style ... What you need is a cinematic equivalent of Lovecraft's prose." H. R. Giger has said he liked O'Bannon's initial Alien storyline "because I found it was in the vein of Lovecraft, one of my greatest sources of inspiration."

Audience research
Findings from an international audience research project conducted by staff from Aberystwyth University, Northumbria University and University of East Anglia were published in 2016 by Palgrave Macmillan as Alien Audiences: Remembering and Evaluating a Classic Movie. 1,125 people were surveyed about their memories and opinions of the film in order to test some of the theories offered by academics and critics about why the film became so popular and why it has endured for so long as a masterpiece. The study discusses memories of Alien in the cinema and on home video from the point of view of everyday audiences, describing how many fans share the film with their children and the shocking impact of the "chestburster" scene, among other things.

Legacy

Critical reassessment
In a 1980 episode of Sneak Previews discussing science fiction films of the 1950s and 1970s, the reviewers were critical of Alien. Roger Ebert reiterated Gene Siskel's earlier opinion, stating that the film was "basically just an intergalactic haunted house thriller set inside a spaceship." He described it as one of several science fiction pictures that were "real disappointments" compared to Star Wars, Close Encounters of the Third Kind, and 2001: A Space Odyssey. However, in both episodes Ebert singled out the early scene of the Nostromo crew exploring the alien planet for praise,  calling the scene "inspired," said that it showed "real imagination" and claimed that it transcended the rest of the film. Over two decades later, Ebert had revised his opinion of the film, including it on his Great Movies list, where he gave it four stars and said "Ridley Scott's 1979 movie is a great original." In 1980, the film was included in Cinefantastiques list of the top films of the 1970s while failing to make the magazine's top ten. Frederick S. Clarke, the magazine's editor, wrote that Alien was "an exercise in style, refreshingly adult in approach, wickedly grim and perverse, that manages to compensate for a lack of depth in both story and characters." In 1982, John Simon of the National Review praised the cast of Alien, particularly Sigourney Weaver, and the film's visual values. Simon also wrote, "For fanciers of horror, among whose numbers I do not count myself, Alien is recommendable, provided they are free from hypocrisy and finicky stomachs".

Despite initial mixed reviews, Alien has received critical acclaim over the years, particularly for its realism and unique environment, and is cited one of the best films of 1979. It is seen as one of the most influential science-fiction films. The website's critical consensus reads, "A modern classic, Alien blends science fiction, horror and bleak poetry into a seamless whole." Metacritic reports a weighted average score of 89 out of 100 based on 34 critics, indicating "universal acclaim". Halliwell's Film Guide awarded it a full four stars, describing it as "a classic of suspense and art direction". Alan Jones of Radio Times awarded it five stars out of five, describing it as a "revolutionary 'haunted house in space' thrill-ride [...] stunning you with shock after shock", praising the "top-notch acting [...] and imaginative bio-mechanical production design", as well as "Ridley Scott's eye for detail and brilliant way of alternating false scares with genuine jolts, which help to create a seamless blend of gothic horror and harrowing science fiction".

Critical interest in the film was re-ignited with the theatrical release of the "Director's Cut" in 2003. Roger Ebert ranked it among "the most influential of modern action pictures" and praised its pacing, atmosphere, and settings:

David A. McIntee praises Alien as "possibly the definitive combination of horror thriller with science fiction trappings." He notes that it is a horror film first and a science fiction film second, since science fiction normally explores issues of how humanity will develop under other circumstances. Alien, on the other hand, focuses on the plight of people being attacked by a monster: "It's set on a spaceship in the future, but it's about people trying not to get eaten by a drooling monstrous animal. Worse, it's about them trying not to get raped by said drooling monstrous animal." Along with Halloween and Friday the 13th (1980), he describes it as a prototype for the slasher film genre: "The reason it's such a good movie, and wowed both the critics, who normally frown on the genre, and the casual cinema-goer, is that it is a distillation of everything that scares us in the movies." He also describes how the film appeals to a variety of audiences: "Fans of Hitchcockian thrillers like it because it's moody and dark. Gorehounds like it for the chest-burster. Science fiction fans love the hard science fiction trappings and hardware. Men love the battle-for-survival element, and women love not being cast as the helpless victim."

David Edelstein wrote, "Alien remains the key text in the 'body horror' subgenre that flowered (or, depending on your viewpoint, festered) in the seventies, and Giger's designs covered all possible avenues of anxiety. Men traveled through vulva-like openings, got forcibly impregnated, and died giving birth to rampaging gooey vaginas dentate — how's that for future shock? This was truly what David Cronenberg would call 'the new flesh,' a dissolution of the boundaries between man and machine, machine and alien, and man and alien, with a psychosexual invasiveness that has never, thank God, been equaled."

In 2008, the American Film Institute ranked Alien as the seventh-best film in the science fiction genre as part of AFI's 10 Top 10, a CBS television special ranking the ten greatest movies in ten classic American film genres. The ranks were based on a poll of over 1,500 film artists, critics, and historians, with Alien ranking just above Terminator 2: Judgment Day (1991) and just below Scott's other science fiction film Blade Runner (1982). The same year, Empire magazine ranked it 33rd on its list of the 500 greatest movies of all time, based on a poll of 10,200 readers, critics, and members of the film industry. In 2021, Phil Pirrello of Syfy ranked it at number two in the "25 scariest sci-fi movies ever made". He described it as a "groundbreaking science fiction classic" and "a movie so influential that it's hard to think of a time before Alien".

Cultural influences

Alien had both an immediate and long-term impact on the science fiction and horror genres. Shortly after its debut, Dan O'Bannon was sued by another writer named Jack Hammer for allegedly plagiarising a script entitled Black Space. However, O'Bannon was able to prove that he had written his Alien script first. In the wake of Alien success, a number of other filmmakers imitated or adapted some of its elements, sometimes by using "Alien" in titles. One of the first was The Alien Dead (1979), which had its title changed at the last minute to cash in on Alien popularity. Contamination (1980) was initially going to be titled Alien 2 until 20th Century Fox's lawyers contacted writer/director Luigi Cozzi and made him change it. The film built on Alien by having many similar creatures, which originated from large, slimy eggs, bursting from characters' chests. An unauthorized sequel to Alien, titled Alien 2: On Earth, was released in 1980 and included alien creatures which incubate in humans. Other science fiction films of the time that borrowed elements from Alien include Galaxy of Terror (1981), Inseminoid (1981), Forbidden World (1982), Xtro (1982), and Dead Space (1991).

The "chestburster" effect was parodied in Mel Brooks's comedy Spaceballs. Near the end, in a diner, John Hurt does a cameo appearance as a customer who seems to be suffering indigestion. He turns out to have an "alien" in his gut, and moans, "Oh, no...not again!"  The "alien" then does a song-and-dance, singing a line of "Hello, Ma Baby", from the classic Warner Bros. cartoon One Froggy Evening.

Nintendo's long-running Metroid video game series, created in 1986, was significantly influenced by Alien, both in stylistic and thematic elements. As an homage to Alien, villains in the first Metroid installment were named Ridley and Mother Brain, after the movie's director and the ship computer, respectively.

In 2002, Alien was deemed "culturally, historically or aesthetically significant" by the National Film Preservation Board of the United States, and was inducted into the National Film Registry of the Library of Congress for historical preservation alongside other films of 1979 including All That Jazz, Apocalypse Now, The Black Stallion, and Manhattan.

In 2019, author J. W. Rinzler published The Making of Alien, a behind-the-scenes book about the making of the film with cast and crew interviews and previously unseen photographs. The Verge praised the book as "the definitive story of the classic horror film".

Eli Roth cites Alien as his primary influence, saying "I saw Alien when I was 8 years old. To me, it was like a combination of Jaws and Star Wars and that's the movie that made me want to be a director. It traumatized me. I actually threw up I was so nervous after I saw it but that's like the highest compliment you can give a horror film." Ty Franck, one of the authors behind the sci-fi series The Expanse, credits Alien as one of his major inspirations.

Merchandise
Alan Dean Foster wrote a novelization of the film in both adult and "junior" versions, which was adapted from the film's shooting script. Heavy Metal magazine published Alien: The Illustrated Story, a graphic novel adaptation of the film scripted by Archie Goodwin and drawn by Walt Simonson, as well as a 1980 Alien calendar. Two behind-the-scenes books were released in 1979 to accompany the film. The Book of Alien contained many production photographs and details on the making of the film, while Giger's Alien contained much of H. R. Giger's concept artwork for the movie. A model kit of the alien, 12 inches high, was released by the Model Products Corporation in the United States, and by Airfix in the United Kingdom. Kenner also produced a larger-scale Alien action figure, as well as a board game in which players raced to be first to reach the shuttle pod while Aliens roamed the Nostromo corridors and air shafts. Official Halloween costumes of the alien were released in October 1979.

School play adaptation
In 2019, students at North Bergen High School in New Jersey adapted the film into a play. The production had no budget, with props and sets developed from recycled toys and other items. Social media recognition brought Scott's attention to the play. He wrote a letter of congratulations to the students ("My hat comes off to all of you for your creativity, imagination, and determination") and recommended they consider an adaptation of his film Gladiator for their next stage production. He donated to the school to put on an encore performance at which Weaver was in attendance. She got on stage before the performance to congratulate the cast and crew for their creativity and commitment.

Sequels and franchise

The success of Alien led 20th Century Fox to finance three direct sequels over the next eighteen years, each by different writers and directors. Sigourney Weaver remained the only recurring actor through all four films: the story of her character Ripley's encounters with the aliens became the thematic and narrative core of the series. James Cameron's Aliens (1986) focused more on action and involved Ripley returning to the planetoid accompanied by marines to confront hordes of aliens. David Fincher's Alien 3 (1992) had nihilistic tones and found her on a prison planet battling another Alien, ultimately sacrificing herself to prevent her employers from acquiring the creatures. Jean-Pierre Jeunet's Alien Resurrection (1997) saw Ripley resurrected through cloning to battle more aliens even further in the future.

The success of the film series resulted in the creation of a media franchise with numerous novels, comic books, video games, toys, and other media and merchandise appearing over the years. A number of these began appearing under the Alien vs. Predator crossover imprint, which brought the alien creatures together with the eponymous characters of the Predator franchise. A film series followed, with Alien vs. Predator in 2004, and Aliens vs. Predator: Requiem in 2007.

Sigourney Weaver has expressed interest in reuniting with Ridley Scott to revive her character for another Alien film. In the 2003 commentary track for the Alien DVD included in the Alien Quadrilogy set, she and Scott both speculated on the possibility, with Weaver stating: "There is an appetite for a fifth one, which is something I never expected...it's really hard to come up with a fifth story that's new and fresh...but I have wanted to go back into space...I think outer space adventure is a good thing for us right now, 'cause Earth is so grim...so we've been talking about it, but very generally." Scott remarked that, if the series were to continue, the most logical course would be to explore the origins of the space jockey and the aliens. Weaver supported this idea, saying "I think it would be great to go back, because I'm asked that question so many times: 'Where did the alien come from?' People really want to know in a very visceral way." David Giler said that he, Walter Hill, and Gordon Carroll, the producers of the first four films in the series, would not be willing to produce another unless it was about the aliens' homeworld and Weaver was on board (despite the fact that they were among the producers of Alien vs. Predator films). Weaver indicated that she would only return to the franchise if either Scott or James Cameron were to direct. Cameron had been working on a story for a fifth Alien film which would explore the origins of the creatures, but ceased work on it when he learned that Fox was pursuing Alien vs. Predator, which he felt would "kill the validity of the franchise".

In July 2009, 20th Century Fox announced that Jon Spaihts had been hired to write a prequel to Alien, with Scott attached to direct. The script was subsequently re-worked by Scott and Damon Lindelof. Titled Prometheus, it went into production in May 2011, and was released the following year. Scott said in a statement: "While Alien was indeed the jumping-off point for this project, out of the creative process evolved a new, grand mythology and universe in which this original story takes place. The keen fan will recognize strands of Alien DNA, so to speak, but the ideas tackled in this film are unique, large and provocative."

Variety reported on February 18, 2015, that a new Alien film would be developed by Neill Blomkamp. On February 25, it was confirmed that Sigourney Weaver would have a role in the film, the intent being to produce a direct sequel to Aliens, ignoring the events of later films, featuring the characters of Hicks and Newt. Blomkamp's sequel was ultimately shelved by Fox in favor of Alien: Covenant, a continuation of Scott's prequel, Prometheus.

Several computer games based on the film were released, but not until several years after its theatrical run.

See also
 List of films featuring extraterrestrials
 List of monster movies

Notes

References

Citations

Bibliography

Further reading

 Anderson, Craig W. "Alien." Science Fiction Films of the Seventies. Jefferson, N.C: McFarland, 1985. Print. 217–224.
 Barker, Martin; Egan, Kate; Ralph, Sarah; Phillips, Tom (2016). Alien Audiences: Remembering and Evaluating a Classic Movie. Palgrave Macmillan. .
 Bell-Meterau, Rebecca. "Woman: The Other Alien in Alien." Women Worldwalkers: New Dimensions of Science Fiction and Fantasy. Ed. Weedman, Jane B. Lubbock, Tex: Texas Tech Press, 1985. Print. 9-24.
 Elkins, Charles, ed. "Symposium on Alien." (Jackie Byars, Jeff Gould, Peter Fitting, Judith Lowder Newton, Tony Safford, Clayton Lee). Science-Fiction Studies 22.3 (Nov. 1980): 278–304.
 Gallardo C., Ximena and C. Jason Smith (2004). Alien Woman: The Making of Lt. Ellen Ripley . Continuum. 
 Matheson, T.J. "Triumphant Technology and Minimal Man: The Technological Society, Science Fiction Films, and Ridley Scott's Alien." Extrapolation 33. 3: 215–229.
 
 Torry, Robert. "Awakening to the Other: Feminism and the Ego-Ideal in Alien." Women's Studies 23 (1994): 343–363.

External links

 
 
 
 
 Alien essay by Daniel Eagan in America's Film Legacy: The Authoritative Guide to the Landmark Movies in the National Film Registry, A&C Black, 2010 , pages 755-756 

1979 films
1979 horror films
1970s monster movies
1970s science fiction horror films
1970s American films
20th Century Fox films
Alien (franchise) films
American monster movies
American science fiction horror films
Android (robot) films
Brandywine Productions films
British monster movies
British science fiction horror films
Cryonics in fiction
1970s English-language films
Films about extraterrestrial life
Films directed by Ridley Scott
Films involved in plagiarism controversies
Films produced by Gordon Carroll
Films produced by Walter Hill
Films scored by Jerry Goldsmith
Films set in the future
Films set on spacecraft
Films shot at Bray Studios
Films shot at Shepperton Studios
Films shot in London
Films that won the Best Visual Effects Academy Award
Films with screenplays by Dan O'Bannon
Films with screenplays by Ronald Shusett
Girls with guns films
Hugo Award for Best Dramatic Presentation winning works
United States National Film Registry films
1970s British films